The copyright directive may refer to, in reverse chronological order, any of the following European Union directives:
 Copyright in the Digital Single Market (2019)
 Copyright Term Directive (2006)
 Enforcement Directive (2004)
 Re-use of public sector information directive (2003)
 Counterfeit goods regulation (2003)
 Resale Rights Directive (2001)
 Information Society Directive (2001)
 Electronic Commerce Directive 2000 (2000)
 Conditional Access Directive (1998)
 Database Directive (1996)
 Copyright Duration Directive (1993)
 Satellite and Cable Directive (1993)
 Rental Directive (1992)
 Computer Programs Directive (1991)

Note that the Copyright in the Digital Single Market directive "updates but does not replace the 11 directives which together comprise the EU’s copyright legislation."

See also
 Copyright law of the European Union
 European Union Directives
 The U.S. Digital Millennium Copyright Act from 1998